Georges Thurnherr (16 April 1886 – 6 April 1956) was a French gymnast who competed in the 1908 Summer Olympics and in the 1920 Summer Olympics. He was born in Eglingen and died in Belfort.

In 1908 he finished 18th in the all-around competition. Twelve years later he was part of the French team, which won the bronze medal in the gymnastics men's team, European system event. In the all-around competition he finished sixth.

References

External links
 

1886 births
1956 deaths
French male artistic gymnasts
Olympic gymnasts of France
Gymnasts at the 1908 Summer Olympics
Gymnasts at the 1920 Summer Olympics
Olympic bronze medalists for France
Olympic medalists in gymnastics
Medalists at the 1920 Summer Olympics
20th-century French people